Robbie Brenner is an American producer and film executive with over 20 years of industry experience. In 2013 she produced Dallas Buyers Club, which starred Matthew McConaughey, Jared Leto, and Jennifer Garner and earned Brenner a nomination for the Academy Award for Best Picture. The film went on to win 3 Academy Awards.

She is currently the Head and Executive Producer of Mattel Films, where she oversees the development of one the largest portfolios of brands and IP into cinematic franchises. Upcoming feature films include Barbie, Hot Wheels, Masters of the Universe, Thomas & Friends, View-Master, Polly Pocket, and many more.

In 2021, Brenner produced the supernatural romance The In Between starring Joey King and Kyle Allen for Paramount+ and women's rights drama Call Jane starring Elizabeth Banks and Sigourney Weaver with Academy Award-nominated writer Phyllis Nagy directing.

Prior to joining Mattel, Brenner produced the independent film Burden starring Garrett Hedlund, Forest Whitaker, and Andrea Riseborough. Burden, directed and written by first-time filmmaker Andrew Heckler,  premiered at the 2018 Sundance Film Festival and won the U.S. Dramatic Audience Award that year.

In 2009, she joined Relativity as Executive Vice President of Production and was integral to the studio's acquisition of the Sundance documentary Catfish, which became a cultural sensation. She was promoted to president in 2011 and oversaw movies such as Immortals, Safe Haven, Mirror, Mirror, Out of the Furnace, The Fighter, and many more.

Brenner worked at Miramax for 9 years and 2 years at 20th Century Fox overseeing and shepherding movies.

She is a film graduate of New York University's Tisch School of the Arts and a member of the Academy of Motion Picture Arts and Sciences Executive Branch.

Filmography
She was a producer in all films unless otherwise noted.

Film

Miscellaneous crew

Production manager

Thanks

Television

Thanks

References

External links
 

American film producers
Living people
Tisch School of the Arts alumni
American film studio executives
Year of birth missing (living people)